For All Time is a 2000 American television science fiction drama film starring Mark Harmon, Mary McDonnell, and Catherine Hicks. It was based on The Twilight Zone episode "A Stop at Willoughby" written by Rod Serling. The teleplay was by Vivienne Radkoff and it was directed by Steven Schachter. The film aired on CBS on October 18, 2000.

Plot summary
Charles Lattimer is an everyday man facing middle age and a marriage to Kristen coming to an end.  He stumbles across a time slip that occurs on one of his regular train rides, as the train goes through a tunnel. Coming across an antique watch, he learns it allows him to get off the train during the time slip, whereupon he finds himself back in the 1890s. Before long he finds a new love, and a new purpose there. The watch gets broken and complications occur when the portal back to the past starts to close, leading him to a decision that could leave him stranded out of his own time.

Cast
 Mark Harmon as Charles Lattimer
 Mary McDonnell as Laura Brown
 Catherine Hicks as Kristen
 Philip Casnoff as Al Glasser
 Bill Cobbs as Proprietor / Conductor
 Brittany Tiplady as Mary
 Ed Evanko as Marshall Latham

Awards and nominations

Nominated for the Golden Reel Award in 2001.

Best Sound Editing - Television Movies and Specials (including Mini-Series) - Music
Best Sound Editing - Television Movies and Specials - Effects & Foley

References

External links
 

2000 television films
2000 films
2000 drama films
2000 science fiction films
2000s English-language films
2000s science fiction drama films
American science fiction drama films
American science fiction television films
CBS network films
American drama television films
Films about time travel
Films directed by Steven Schachter
Films set in the 1890s
Television films based on television series
2000s American films